The Avon Football Association is an Australian rules football competition in the Avon Valley region of country Western Australia.

History

The AFA was formed in 1959 through the merger of the East Avon FA (EAFA) and Avon Valley FA (AVFA).

In 1952, the AVFA applied to enter a team in the Perth-based Western Australian National Football League (WANFL). The WANFL secretary Billy Orr suggested in 1954 that the AVFA should merge with the EAFA and the Goomalling and District Football Association (GDFA) to form a stronger league in line with the newly created South West Football League (SWFL). However, the GDFA rejected the suggestion on the grounds that it would weaken local clubs and would resulting in too-long travelling times. The AVFA and EAFA met in 1954 to discuss the merger proposal and the possibly of fielding a team in the WANFL.

Current clubs

Former clubs

Grand final results 

Source:
Scores sourced from Northam Advertiser and The West Australian newspapers

Ladders

2002 ladder

2003 ladder

2004 ladder

2005 ladder

2006 ladder

2007 ladder

2008 ladder

2009 ladder

2010 ladder

2011 ladder

2012 ladder

2013 ladder

2014 ladder

2015 ladder

2016 ladder

2017 ladder

References

Further reading 
 A Way of Life - The Story of country football in Western Australia - Alan East
 WA footy forum 

Australian rules football competitions in Western Australia